The Tondaiman family were Tamil rulers of the ancient Tondai Nadu (Tondaimandalam) division of Tamilakkam in South India. Their capital was at Kanchipuram.

They ruled with the Pallava dynasty, which controlled northern Tamil Nadu and Andhra Pradesh and had its capital at Kanchipuram. Hundreds of records and edicts exist pertaining to the Tondaiman rulers of Chola dynasty.

Sangam literature
Ruler Tondaiman Ilandiraiyan was mentioned in Purananuru (புறநானூறு) (in one of the poems written by Avvaiyar) as a king confronting Adhiaman; battle was avoided by the tactics of Avvaiyaar. He is said to be the founder of Pallava dynasty. Pathupaattu (பத்துப்பாட்டு) a sangam literature work mentioned that Tondaiman Ilandriyan ruled Kanchipuram town before 2500 years.

Chola Empire
The Tondaiman title was borne by various chiefs in the Chola empire, notable ones being Karunakara Tondaiman and Naralokaviran alias Porkoyil Tondaiman who served as generals under Kulottunga I.

The poet Kambar wrote Silaiyezhupathu about Karunagara Tondaiman.

Origin

Aranthangi Tondaimans

The Aranthangi Tondaimans ruled Aranthangi from the 15th to the 18th centuries in southern Tamil Nadu. There are references to the Aranthangi Tondaimans in temple inscriptions at Avudayarkovil, Alapiranthan, Palaiyavanam, Pillaivayal, Aranthangi, Kovilur, Paramandur, Palankarai, Piranmalai, Thiruvarankulam and Kurumbur. Similarly, the Aranthangi Tondaimans were an independent line of chieftains ruling from Aranthangi; they flourished about 200 years before the rule of the Thondaman dynasty of Pudukottai (which began about 1640).

The Aranthangi Tondaimans were the chief patrons of the Avudayarkovil temple, and liberally donated to its maintenance (as indicated by copper plates in the possession of the Tiruvavaduthurai Adheenam). They donated land to the Tiruvarur, Rameswaram, Kanchipuram and Benares temples. About 25 copper plates indicating grants from the Aranthangi Tondaimans have been recorded so far; 16 are in the Thiruvavaduthurai Adheenam.Their direct descendants were the Palayavanam Zamin "Vanangamudi Pandarathar". The Thondaiman kings of the Pudukkottai principality who came to power in the 17th century were their descendants.

Notes

References
The Imperial and Asiatic quarterly review and oriental and colonial record. Oriental Institute (Woking, England), East India Association (London, England).
Bhavaraju Venkatakrishna Rao, Bhāvarāju Vēṅkaṭakr̥ṣṇarāvu, History of the Eastern Chalukyas of Vengi, 610-1210 A.D..
C. Sivaratnam, The Tamils in Early Ceylon.
M. Krishna Kumari, History of Medieval Andhradesa.
Kallidaikurichi Aiyah Nilakanta Sastri, The Cōḷas
N. Sethuraman, The Cholas: Mathematics Reconstructs the Chronology
K.V. Raman, Sri Varadarajaswami Temple, Kanchi: A Study of Its History, Art and Architecture
Sakkottai Krishnaswami Aiyangar, Ancient India: collected essays on the literary and political history of Southern India
Ramachandra Dikshitar, Studies in Tamil Literature and History
Tamil culture, Volume 4. Tamil Literature Society, Academy of Tamil Culture

Chola dynasty
Tamil monarchs